The Happy Station Show was one of the world's longest-running international radio programmes, having originated in 1928 on shortwave radio and airing its final edition on 27 December 2020.

The original show followed a format of light entertainment, special guests, music, and information about Dutch life. Later, the show pioneered international call-in shows, in both the English and Spanish versions, during the 1970s.

Happy Station was PCJJ and then Radio Netherlands Worldwide's most popular programme, claiming an audience of as high as 100 million in the 1930s and 25 million in the 1970s.

Happy Station'''s run was interrupted twice — from 1940 until 1946 due to World War II and again from 1995 when it was cancelled until its revival in 2009. The revived programme was not affiliated with Radio Netherlands Worldwide or RNW Media.

History
Eddy Startz
The program premiered on November 19, 1928 and was broadcast first by the private Philips Radio station PCJJ (later PCJ), and from 1947 by Radio Netherlands. Separate English and Spanish versions were broadcast around the world on shortwave. Popular music from Europe and various other countries was mixed with vintage recordings and multilingual light patter, switching back and forth in up to seven languages each Sunday. According to presenter Eddy Startz: "I was playing sambas and rumbas before anyone here had ever heard of them." Startz would begin every episode with the Dutch national anthem followed by a John Philip Sousa march. At some point during each programme, he would tap a teacup with a spoon and play his signature tune, “A Nice Cup of Tea” by Henry Hall to introduce the show's mail call segments.

The programme became popular since it gave listeners a chance to travel in their armchair during a period when international travel was difficult for most people. In particular, the Startz-era of the show featured special formats such as a voyage by sound where Startz narrated tours to distant locations assisted by sound effects.

Under Startz, Happy Station was 90 minutes long and was for many years broadcast not only on Sunday but several other days of the week; in 1964 it was reduced to 80 minutes. A typical show would be composed of musical entertainment and announcements in several languages, "Spotlight on Holland" featuring light news items about the Netherlands, the Mailbag during which Startz would read and answer listener mail from around the world, and a musical signoff.Happy Station was intended as a respite from the news of crisis and conflict that dominated short wave radio, saying: "We believe in amusing, our listeners abroad. They are fed up with the nationalist propaganda ladled out over the air from the dictatorship countries", and "you will hear no war news from us." In 1940, during the phoney war period of World War II, The New York Times wrote of Startz and Happy Station that "While England shouts across the channel such blasts as 'Never again shall one nations plunge the whole world into war! The guilt is German's alone,' and the Reich Radio from Lord Haw Haw's wave again sinks the British navy, 'Eddie' may be playing 'I'm Forever Blowing Bubbles' or remarking on the fresh supply of tulips now poking through the sod."

Broadcasts from the Netherlands were interrupted by the German invasion in May 1940. Startz broadcast the events of the invasion on PCJ for four days until he was arrested. PCJ staff were ordered to destroy the powerful PCJ transmitters in hopes of preventing them from being used by the Nazis."50 Years Shortwave In Holland : klankbeeld 1977-04-15 / 1977-03-30" , RNW While the Germans used forced labour to rebuild a partially-damaged transmitter and use it for radio propaganda, Startz dropped out of broadcasting for the remainder of the war. PCJ and Startz's Happy Station resumed broadcasting in 1946, following the end of the war. In 1947, the Happy Station Show was transferred to the new Radio Netherlands Worldwide when PCJ was nationalized.

Edward "Eddie" Startz presented the program from its inception until his retirement in December 1969. Startz was born Eduard Franz Conradin Startz in Neutral Moresnet in 1899. Morsenet was on the border of Belgium, Germany, and Holland and under the joint sovereignty of Belgium and Prussia (in practice, Belgium and Germany), and Startz grew up in the Dutch town of Vaals near the point where all four borders met. After finishing school, Startz moved to the United States where he lived for five years while attending university, and worked his way through school working as a dishwasher, waiter, and travelling salesman. In 1925, he began working as a sailor, and travelled to South America, where he picked up Spanish and Portuguese. He returned to Holland in 1928 where he found work as a translator but soon was hired as an announcer at PCJJ, which had just begun broadcasting and where his multilingualism was an asset. A German national by birth, he became a Dutch citizen in 1936 and general manager of PCJ in 1938. Although the retirement age in Holland is 65, Startz continued broadcasting Happy Station until his 70s and reluctantly retired from Happy Station at the end of 1969; he died in 1976.

Tom Meijer
Tom Meijer took over and hosted the English and Spanish versions from January 1970 until his own retirement in 1993. Born Thomas Hendrik Meijer on November 16, 1938, he was known as "Tom Meyer" by international audiences.

Meijer was born in Amsterdam to a Swiss mother and Dutch father. In 1941, the family escaped Nazi-occupied Holland by fleeing through France, Spain and Cuba before settling on Trinidad and then Curaçao. After World War II, the family returned to Holland before moving to Singapore, and then returning again to Holland.

Meijer studied to be a pharmacist. before switching to law, but found he preferred music and theatre. He became a semi-professional touring performer for two years, appearing occasionally on television and radio while holding down a job in international marketing.

In 1965, he was hired by Radio Nederland as a Dutch-language announcer. Fluent in English, German, and French, he was appointed the host of Happy Station after the show's founder, Edward Startz, retired after 41 years. 
 
Meijer hosted English and Spanish versions of the show played over 15 hours on Sundays as it was broadcast to different areas around the globe. Under his tutelage, the show pioneered live international phone-in shows. However, its format remained largely musically based, Meijer's musical tastes were more contemporary than Startz's and tended to be in the easy listening genre, with Meijer himself sometimes performing songs. World music would also be played. Meijer also encouraged listener interaction with the show, with a mailbag segment and a listener birthday feature, the Birthday Book, where he would wish read out the names of listeners whose birthdays coincided with that week's airdate and wish them a happy birthday. There were "No more “cuppa’s”, no more animal farm or Sousa marches, but live shows from outside locations; travel stories with sound effects, recorded on the spot by Meyer; the famous “birthday-book”; dramatized Easter Egg Hunts; and to top it all: live inter-continental telephone call-in shows" The show also ran a pen pal club encouraging listeners across the world to write each other. The show was cut down from 80 minutes to 50 minutes in 1977, along with other RNW programming. In the 1990s, Happy Station was again shortened in order to accommodate a Radio Netherlands news bulletin at the start of the hour. Previously, Sundays were the only days on which RNW didn't broadcast news bulletins.

Later years
Tom Meijer was followed as host of the English version of the show by long-time BBC and Radio Netherlands broadcaster Pete Myers from 1992 to 1993 Myers was assigned with updating the show and bringing it into the 1990s. He played rock and roll music on the programme for the first time, upsetting some traditional listeners who wrote in with complaints. "I played Ray Charles and got dozens of complaints!" Myers said. "They said "Who IS this Ray Charles?" "The old listeners want clogs, windmills, that kind of Dutch stuff. But right from my first programme I said "It's sex, drugs and rock 'n' roll from now on'. The young ones all want that from Holland...You choose your cliches really," he added. Meyers also brought a camp style to the programme. Myers also travelled with the show, broadcasting its 65th anniversary from a hot tub in Aruba. He retired from the show after hosting over 100 episodes, ostensibly due to his need to take several months off in order to undergo and then recuperate from surgery, but also because he felt a younger host was needed in order to bring in the younger audience Radio Netherlands wanted. "I feel too old for it all," said Myers in an interview,  "I can't relate to the music." Jonathan Groubert, who had often acted as Myers's sidekick, took over the show in 1993 and presented it for two years until 1995 when Radio Netherlands ended the series.

Jaime Báguena, hosted the Spanish version, La Estación de la Alegría, from Tom Meijer's retirement in 1992 until 1999 when it was canceled by Radio Netherlands' management. The show was popular in Latin America, and had an active following in Cuba. La Estación de la Alegría was replaced by a similar program, Cartas @ RN, which was hosted by Baguena but had a running time of 25 minutes instead of 55 minutes. Buguena was succeeded as the show's presenter by Sergio Acosta from 2010 until the show ended in June 2012 due to the closure of Radio Netherlands as a shortwave service.

Revival
On March 12, 2009, the program was resurrected as an independent broadcast produced by Taiwan-based PCJ Media via Radio Miami International (WRMI), which was also transmitted globally through podcasting and Internet streaming audio. The producer and presenter of this version was Canadian expatriate Keith Perron, who in the past had been employed or worked freelance for Radio Canada International, Radio Havana Cuba, China Radio International, Radio Netherlands, the BBC World Service and other shortwave broadcasters. The new programme was not produced in the Netherlands and had no involvement from Radio Netherlands Worldwide save that Perron had been given permission by RNW to use the Happy Station name.

Tom Meijer, who hosted RNW's Happy Station'' in the 1970s and 1980s was involved as a consultant, and made occasional on-air contributions. Meijer's successor at RNW, Jonathan Groubert, also appeared as a guest on the revived show.

The new program was produced in Taipei, and an over-the-air version was broadcast on shortwave from WRMI's transmitters in Okeechobee, Florida in the United States and intermittently on various other shortwave relays.

The show continued as a weekly podcast and internet radio show as well as being syndicated to various FM and medium wave partner stations in up to 37 countries around the world. The show's final edition aired on 27 December 2020.

References

External links
Happy Station - highlights of the Eddy Startz era
Happy Station Show - hosted by Tom Meijer - 16 November 1980
Happy Station - final Pete Myers programme - 24 July 1994
Happy Station - last show on Radio Netherlands - 17 September 1995
 Programme archives
 Program of 31 December 2011: Keith Perron interviews Tom Meyer (mp3)
 Eddy Startz & The Happy Station -DJ to the World’s Largest Happy Family
 film clip of Startz's Happy Station in 1955.

Dutch music radio programs
English-language radio programs
Taiwanese radio programs
1928 radio programme debuts
2020 radio programme endings
Radio Netherlands Worldwide programs